RFA Spa (A192) was a coastal water carrier of the Royal Fleet Auxiliary. Her bell is now in the chapel of St Nicholas, Langstone, Havant.

References

Spa-class coastal water carriers
1941 ships